Beethoven Lives Upstairs is a 1992 HBO Original Historical fiction Film produced and directed by David Devine. Based on a very popular children's audio recording written and directed by Barbara Nichol, the film stars Illya Woloshyn as Christoph, a young boy who develops a friendship with composer Ludwig van Beethoven (Neil Munro), a boarder in the boy's parents' house. The film was shot in Prague in the Czech Republic and has been broadcast in over 110 countries in numerous languages and has sold over one million DVDs. The film is used extensively, thanks to its American Library Association's reviews and awards, in U.S. and Canadian elementary and middle school music classrooms.

The film went on to win the Primetime Emmy Award for Outstanding Children's Program in 1993, was nominated for 4 Gemini Awards, won the New England Film Festival, and was presented the Award of Excellence from the U.S. National Board of Film Review. Beethoven Lives Upstairs was also admitted to the Permanent Collection in the Paley Center for Media in New York City.



Plot

Ten-year-old Christoph's physician father has died, and his family struggles to make ends meet. Christoph's uncle Kurt, a student at the Vienna Conservatory, arranges for Ludwig van Beethoven to rent their attic room. Kurt is thrilled to have the famous composer living at his late brother's house, despite Beethoven's dismissive attitude toward a mere student.  Christoph, however, doesn't like having a stranger in the house, is put off by Beethoven's eccentric behavior (such as dumping food on a waiter during a quarrel), and is teased by the neighborhood children for having a madman in the house.  Kurt tells Christoph about the pain of Beethoven's deafness and implores him to give the man a chance.

When Christoph's mother enters Beethoven's room, he is writing music on the shutters, presumably for lack of paper. Seeing her shock, he sheepishly suggests she could later sell the shutters as collectors items. He asks her about her musical background, and she plays "Für Elise" for him, beginning to see his softer side.

While working on his Ninth Symphony in his room with other musicians, Beethoven needs to make edits, but has destroyed all their pens in previous fits. They frantically send Christoph out to buy more, but they leave before he returns.  So Beethoven takes Christoph out for a walk, where the two begin to form a bond.  Soon, Christoph begins seeing things from Beethoven's side. After overhearing Beethoven talk about his misery from being deaf, Christoph gives him an ear trumpet designed by his father.

Kurt comes over to the house for another rehearsal, beaming that he will be part of the orchestra at the premiere of the Ninth. Beethoven notices Christoph and his mother listening outside the door, and promises them tickets to the performance.

As the date of the concert nears, Beethoven becomes increasingly stressed and frustrated by setbacks. Christoph enters after Beethoven has had yet another quarrel with Sophie, their maid, and accidentally spills the sheet music for the concert.  Beethoven angrily orders him out.  Kurt reassures Christoph that Beethoven's notorious tempers are short-lived and that someone able to write music as he does must have a great heart. Later, Beethoven humbly apologizes to Sophie for his behavior and hands her the tickets to give to Christoph and his mother.

The concert is a great success. Beethoven is nominally conducting, but can't hear the orchestra, so Kurt discreetly conducts from the side. The orchestra finishes while Beethoven is still "conducting", so Kurt and one of the singers turn him around so he can see the audience's wild standing ovation.

After Beethoven's death, Christoph reflects on his experiences, saying that although Beethoven is gone, "his music will never die", and how Beethoven "thought he could change the world with his music – maybe he will... bit by bit."

Cast

Neil Munro as Ludwig van Beethoven
Illya Woloshyn as Christoph
Fiona Reid as Mother
Paul Soles as Anton Schindler
Albert Schultz as Uncle Kurt
Sheila McCarthy as Sophie

Accolades

References

External links

1992 films
1992 drama films
Depictions of Ludwig van Beethoven on film
Films set in the 1820s
Films set in Vienna
Canadian drama television films
Films shot in Prague
1992 television films
Canadian historical drama films
Films about composers
Films about classical music and musicians
1990s Canadian films
Films about disability